The chattering cisticola (Cisticola anonymus) is a species of bird in the family Cisticolidae.
It is found in Angola, Cameroon, Central African Republic, Republic of the Congo, Democratic Republic of the Congo, Equatorial Guinea, Gabon, Nigeria, and Sierra Leone.
Its natural habitats are dry savanna and swamps.

References

Cisticola
Birds of Central Africa
Birds described in 1855
Taxa named by Johann Wilhelm von Müller
Taxonomy articles created by Polbot